Conophytum pellucidum, called the transparent cone plant, is a species of flowering plant in the genus Conophytum, native to the western Cape Provinces of South Africa. It has gained the Royal Horticultural Society's Award of Garden Merit.

Subtaxa
The following subspecies and varieties are currently accepted:
Conophytum pellucidum subsp. cupreatum (Tischer) S.A.Hammer
Conophytum pellucidum var. lilianum (Littlew.) S.A.Hammer
Conophytum pellucidum var. neohallii S.A.Hammer
Conophytum pellucidum subsp. saueri S.A.Hammer & Smale
Conophytum pellucidum var. terrestre (Tischer) S.A.Hammer

References

pellucidum
Endemic flora of South Africa
Flora of the Cape Provinces
Plants described in 1927